American School & University (AS&U) is a magazine Produced by Endeavor Business Media that describes operations of educational facilities, including design and construction of new school buildings, maintenance and renovation of existing ones, and school building management. It is marketed to administrators of primary and secondary schools and tertiary institutions. The senior editor for this publication is Mike Kennedy

References

External links
 American School & University
 

Business magazines published in the United States
Magazines established in 1929
Magazines published in Philadelphia
Professional and trade magazines